Ruslan Agabekovich Agalarov (born 21 February 1974) professional football manager and a former midfielder. Born in the USSR, he represented the Uzbekistan national team.

Career

International
Agalarov was born in the USSR, and is of Dagestani descent. He chose to play for the Uzbekistan national team, and earned 1 cap for them.

Management
On 29 September 2015 Agalarov was appointed as caretaker manager of FC Anzhi Makhachkala following the departure of Yuri Semin. Agalarov left Anzhi at the end of the 2015–16 season, after securing Anzhi's place in the Russian Premier League with a play-off victory over Volgar Astrakhan.

Personal life
His son Gamid Agalarov and his younger brother Kamil Agalarov are also professional footballers.

Career statistics

Club

International

Statistics accurate as of 31 May 2016

Managerial
Information correct as of match played 27 May 2016. Only competitive matches are counted.

References

External links
 
 Career history at playerhistory.com

1974 births
Living people
Uzbekistani footballers
Uzbekistan international footballers
Uzbekistani football managers
Russian footballers
Russian Premier League players
Russian First League players
Russian Second League players
Russian football managers
Uzbekistani people of Dagestani descent
Russian people of Dagestani descent
FC Anzhi Makhachkala players
FC Anzhi Makhachkala managers
Russian Premier League managers
Association football midfielders
FC Dynamo Makhachkala players
Sportspeople from Makhachkala